Devon Myles William Brown (born 21 May 1992) is a South African swimmer who attended Highbury Preparatory School in Hillcrest. and Kearsney College in Botha's Hill.

He competed at the 2014 FINA World Swimming Championships (25 m), at the 2015 World Aquatics Championships, and at the 2016 Summer Olympics in Rio de Janeiro. At the 2016 Summer Olympics, he competed in the 200 m freestyle and 400 m freestyle events. In the 200 m freestyle event, he finished 13th in the heats with a time of 1:46.78 and qualified for the semifinals where he finished 12th with a time of 1:46.57 and did not advance to the final. In the 400 m freestyle event, he finished 12th in the heats with a time of 3:45.92 and did not qualify for the final. He was also part of South Africa's 4 × 200 m freestyle relay team which finished 10th in the heats and did not qualify for the final. Brown was part of the 4 × 100 m medley relay team that finished 13th in the heats and did not qualify for the final.

References

External links

Living people
South African male swimmers
Olympic swimmers of South Africa
Swimmers at the 2016 Summer Olympics
Commonwealth Games medallists in swimming
1992 births
Commonwealth Games bronze medallists for South Africa
Swimmers at the 2014 Commonwealth Games
African Games gold medalists for South Africa
African Games medalists in swimming
African Games silver medalists for South Africa
African Games bronze medalists for South Africa
Swimmers at the 2015 African Games
Alumni of Kearsney College
Medallists at the 2014 Commonwealth Games